The Dominion Energy Charity Classic is a professional golf tournament in Virginia on the PGA Tour Champions, played at Country Club of Virginia in Henrico, Virginia. The inaugural edition was in November 2016. The event features a 72-player field competing for a $2 million purse, and is a no-cut 54-hole event.

Winners

References

External links
Coverage on the PGA Tour Champions' official site

PGA Tour Champions events
Golf in Virginia